The second series of British reality television series The Apprentice (UK) was broadcast in the UK on BBC Two, from 22 February to 10 May 2006. Following the success of the previous series, the BBC commissioned additional episodes of the programme, along with ordering the creation of a new companion discussion programme titled The Apprentice: You're Fired!, which was aimed at being aired on BBC Three alongside the main programme's broadcast schedule. A special titled "Tim in the Firing Line", focusing on Tim Campbell's life after winning the first series, aired on 19 February 2006 and preceded this series' premiere. Alongside the standard twelve episodes of the series, it is the only series to not feature any specials being aired alongside its broadcast.

Fourteen candidates took part in the second series, with Michelle Dewberry becoming the overall winner. Excluding the special, the series averaged around 4.43 million viewers during its broadcast. A year after it had concluded, a candidate later raised a complaint against the BBC for their portrayal in the second series, which was refuted due to contradicting evidence from the broadcaster and production staff.

Series overview 
Following favourable ratings and viewing figures for the first series, the BBC commissioned additional episodes of The Apprentice, with Alan Sugar, Nick Hewer and Margaret Mountford returning to assume their roles within the programme and aid in production of the second series. One request made of production staff by the broadcaster was that a companion discussion show be created to air alongside it. This led to the creation of The Apprentice: You're Fired!, a sister show that would air on BBC Three and operate within a similar format to spin-off sister shows like Big Brother's Little Brother and Strictly Come Dancing: It Takes Two. The search for a host for this programme led to chief football presenter Adrian Chiles being offered the role, with his acceptance revealed prior to the second series' premiere episode.

As with the first series, production staff and researchers went through applications made by those who sought to participate in the programme, until around fourteen candidates, consisting of the same balanced mix of genders, were informed in Summer 2005 that they had landed a place in the final line-up for the second series. Filming began later that year in Autumn, with the first task seeing the men name their team Invicta, while the women named their team Velocity. Although candidates faced a similar setup of tasks with only subtle changes to what these involved, one notable difference was that the Interviews stage was overseen by Paul Kemsley, Claude Littner, and Bordan Tkachuk, who returned to assume their roles, as it was decided that Hewer and Mountford would mainly supply feedback on observations over past tasks during discussions between Sugar and the interviewers. As with the previous series, the candidates faced a charity-based task, which this time featured a reward as done on similar tasks in the American original, before the use of it was discontinued following the conclusion of the series' broadcast.

This series is the first in the show's history to feature the iconic sequence involving the winner departing in Sugar's personal Rolls-Royce, giving a brief interview on their success, a sequence that was created to purely emphasise their victory on the programme as the overall winner. Of those who took part, Michelle Dewberry would become the eventual winner of this series, and go on to briefly take up a post under Sugar following its conclusion, leaving in September 2006 following a series of personal problems. Throughout its filming, prior to it being edited and prepared for broadcast, Sugar voiced issues to the production staff with the programme's format at the time – due to the number of candidates taking part against the number of episodes for the series, he was not allowed to fire more than one candidate in any task prior to the Interviews stage, despite the fact that two of the tasks featured outcomes where he felt more than one candidate deserved to be fired by him. Staff eventually reviewed the format after the production and broadcast of the second series, which led to eventual changes when work began on the third series.

Candidates

Performance chart 

Key:
 The candidate won this series of The Apprentice.
 The candidate was the runner-up.
 The candidate won as project manager on his/her team, for this task.
 The candidate lost as project manager on his/her team, for this task.
 The candidate was on the winning team for this task / they passed the Interviews stage.
 The candidate was on the losing team for this task.
 The candidate was brought to the final boardroom for this task.
 The candidate was fired in this task.
 The candidate lost as project manager for this task and was fired.

Episodes

Criticism 
Mani Sandher portrayal claim

In 2007, a year after the second series had been aired, Mani Sandher filed a complaint against the BBC, criticising them for his portrayal on The Apprentice, on grounds that he been unfairly treated by the broadcaster. The BBC Trust investigated the complaint and later rejected the accusations. Their findings pointed out that Sandher was aware that the programme was subject to editing after filming, and that this had been done to an acceptable standard that was not misleading per Ofcom's broadcasting codes. Although Sandher later attempted to appeal against the Trust's decision on his complaint, the Editorial Complaints Unit of the BBC dismissed this.

Ratings 
Official episode viewing figures are from BARB.

Specials

References

External links 

 
 Times Online interview with Alan Sugar
 Amstrad Site
 Blog of the 2nd series written by marketing expert Steve Gibson

2006 British television seasons
02